Cornulitida is an extinct order of encrusting animals from class Tentaculita, which were common around the globe in the Ordovician to Devonian oceans, and survived until the Carboniferous.

The organisms had shells, and were subject to predation by boring and other means from the Ordovician onwards.  Many survived attacks by predators. Several cornulitids were endobiotic symbionts in the stromatoporoids and tabulates.

Their affinity is unknown; they have been placed in many phyla, and have been considered worms, corals, molluscs and more. They appear to be closely related to other taxa of uncertain affinity, including the microconchids, trypanoporids and tentaculitids.

References

Tentaculita
Middle Ordovician first appearances
Pennsylvanian extinctions
Prehistoric animal orders